Albert B. Heagy (December 3, 1906 – April 1, 1990) was an American chemist, educator, politician, and college lacrosse player and coach. Alongside, Jack Faber, he was the co-head coach of the University of Maryland lacrosse team from 1931 to 1963, and the head coach from 1964 to 1965, and amassed a combined record of 245–57–7. During that time, Maryland secured six outright national championships, two shared national championships, and nine Atlantic Coast Conference championships. He was inducted into the National Lacrosse Hall of Fame in 1965. Heagy also served as the Maryland state chemist and the mayor of University Park.

Early life
Heagy was born in 1906 in Rockville, Maryland. He attended Western High School, where he played football and basketball for three years. Heagy served as the basketball team captain as a senior. He graduated from Western High School in 1926.

Heagy attended college at the University of Maryland, where he earned a Bachelor of Science degree in 1930. While there, he earned nine varsity letters on the football, basketball, and lacrosse teams. In 1929, the United States Intercollegiate Lacrosse Association named Heagy an honorable mention All-American at inside defense. In 1930, the USILA named him to the first team at first defense. At Maryland, Heagy was also three-time class president, a member of the Sigma Nu fraternity, and a member of the Omicron Delta Kappa honor society.

Coaching career
After graduation, Heagy assisted Maryland head coach Jack Faber as a "co-head coach" responsible for running the team's defense. From 1931 to 1963, Heagy served as co-coach of the Maryland lacrosse team alongside Jack Faber. During that time period, Faber and Heagy led the Terrapins to a 224–52–2 record. After Faber retired in 1963, Heagy took over as the team's sole head coach in 1964 and 1965. In those two seasons, he amassed a record of 21–5.

Professional career
In August 1930, Heagy began working as a chemist for the State Inspection Service. He rose through the ranks and was appointed the state chemist for the Maryland Department of Chemistry on February 1, 1962, while at the same time serving on the faculty at the University of Maryland.

Heagy also held offices with the United States Intercollegiate Lacrosse Association, the State of Maryland Athletic Hall of Fame, the Arts and Sciences Executive Committee, Board of Directors of the M Club, and as chairman of the Scholarship Fund. He served as a councilman and mayor of University Park, Maryland, and also held posts with the Prince George's County Heart Association, the Draft Board, the College Park Rotary Club, the Parent-Teachers Association, and the Boy Scouts.

Later life
On August 8, 1940, Heagy married his wife Elizabeth, with whom he had a son and a daughter. Heagy was inducted into the University of Maryland Athletic Hall of Fame in 1984. He retired on June 30, 1986. In 1987, the University of Maryland alumni organization, the M Club, established the Al Heagy Scholarship Fund with a $500 donation from seven members, which included Jack Heise and Hotsy Alperstein. Heagy died from a stroke on April 1, 1990, at Prince George's Hospital Center in Cheverly, Maryland.

References

External links
National Lacrosse Hall of Fame entry

1906 births
1990 deaths
Sportspeople from Rockville, Maryland
20th-century American chemists
Mayors of places in Maryland
University of Maryland, College Park faculty
Maryland Terrapins men's lacrosse players
Maryland Terrapins football players
Maryland Terrapins men's basketball players
People from University Park, Maryland
20th-century American politicians
American men's basketball players